The Nebraska Department of Revenue is an agency of the Nebraska state government responsible for the administration of state revenue and tax programs.  The Nebraska Constitution prohibits use of a property tax, thus most revenue is collected from a state sales tax, use taxes, and a state income tax.  The department also oversees the Nebraska Lottery and "Charitable Gaming".

The department headquarters are located at the State Office Building, at 301 Centennial Mall, South, in Lincoln, Nebraska.  The current Tax Commissioner of Nebraska is Tony Fulton.  He was appointed by Governor Pete Ricketts in January 2016. The Tax Commissioner of Nebraska is also the Director of the Nebraska Department of Revenue.

Tax commissioners
The office of state tax commissioner was established by an amendment to the Constitution of Nebraska in 1920. The state tax commissioner is appointed by the Governor of Nebraska, with the consent of the Nebraska Legislature.

See also
 Nebraska Lottery

References

External links
 Official website
 Nebraska e-file
 Nebraska Lottery

Revenue